VN or Vn may refer to:

Vietnam (ISO 3166-1 alpha-2 country code VN)
.vn, the country code top-level domain (ccTLD) for Vietnam
Visual novel, a type of interactive fiction game
Vestibular nuclei, collections of neurons in the brain of humans and primates
Holden VN Commodore, an automobile introduced by Holden in 1988
Kawasaki VN "Vulcan", motorcycle series
Vanadium(III) nitride, an inorganic chemical compound
Vanilla Ninja, a popular Estonian girl group
Vault Network, a group of gaming websites and message boards
Vietnam Airlines (IATA airline designator VN)